George Francis Richardson (December 6, 1829 – March 22, 1912) was an American lawyer and politician who served as the nineteenth mayor of Lowell, Massachusetts,  and as a member of the Massachusetts State Senate.

Early life
Richardson was born to Daniel and Hannah (Adams) Richardson, in Tyngsborough, Massachusetts, on December 6, 1829.

1868 Republican National Convention
Richardson served as delegate to the Republican National Convention in 1868.

See also
 1871 Massachusetts legislature
 1872 Massachusetts legislature

References

1829 births
People from Tyngsborough, Massachusetts
Phillips Exeter Academy alumni
Harvard Law School alumni
Mayors of Lowell, Massachusetts
Lowell, Massachusetts City Council members
Massachusetts lawyers
Republican Party Massachusetts state senators
People of Massachusetts in the American Civil War
Adams political family
1912 deaths